The  1997 Paegas Czech Open was a men's tennis tournament played on clay in Prague, Czech Republic that was part of the International Series of the 1997 ATP Tour.
Yevgeny Kafelnikov was the defending champion, but lost in the second round to Marcello Craca.

Cédric Pioline won the title by defeating Bohdan Ulihrach 6–2, 5–7, 7–6(7–4) in the final.

Seeds

Draw

Finals

Top half

Bottom half

References

External links
 Official results archive (ATP)
 Official results archive (ITF)

Singles
Prague Open (1987–1999)
1997 in Czech tennis